The 1912 New York state election was held on November 5, 1912, to elect the governor, the lieutenant governor, the Secretary of State, the state comptroller, the attorney general, the state treasurer, the state engineer and two judges of the New York Court of Appeals, as well as all members of the New York State Assembly and the New York State Senate. The voters were also asked if they approved a $50,000,000 bond issue for "good roads construction," which was answered in the affirmative, with 657,548 For and 281,265 Against.

History
The Socialist state convention met on June 30 at Auburn, New York. They nominated again, like in 1910, Charles Edward Russell for governor; Gustave Adolph Strebel for lieutenant governor; and Henry L. Slobodin for attorney general. They also nominated Carrie W. Allen, of Onondaga County, for secretary of state; Olin Hoxie Smith, of Schenectady, for comptroller; Frank Ehrenfried, of Erie County, for treasurer; and Dr. Charles H. Furman, of Brooklyn, for state engineer.

The Progressive state convention met on September 6 at Syracuse, New York. Oscar S. Straus was chairman. The convention nominated Straus for governor by acclamation amid great noise after the name of New York City Comptroller William A. Prendergast, the bosses' and Theodore Roosevelt's choice, was withdrawn by Timothy L. Woodruff.

The Republican state convention met on September 27 at Saratoga Springs, New York.

The Democratic state convention met on October 2 at Syracuse, New York. Alton B. Parker was elected permanent chairman with 412 votes against 33 for John K. Sague, the Mayor of Poughkeepsie. Congressman William Sulzer was nominated for governor after the third ballot (first ballot: John Alden Dix [incumbent] 147, Sulzer 136, Herman A. Metz 70, Martin H. Glynn 46, George H. Burd 28, Francis Burton Harrison 21, William Sohmer 1; second ballot: Sulzer 141, Dix 124, Metz 68, Glynn 48, Burd 28, Harrison 27, Sohmer 2, Robert F. Wagner 2, James Aloysius O'Gorman 1, Victor J. Dowling 1; third ballot: Sulzer 195, Dix 87, Metz 76, Glynn 41, Harrison 21, Burd 9, Dowling 4, Wagner 3, O'Gorman 1, Ellison 1, George W. Batten 1, James W. Gerard 1; then Dix and Metz withdrew, and Sulzer was chosen). Ex-Comptroller Martin H. Glynn (in office 1907-08) was nominated for lieutenant governor by acclamation, and the convention adjourned an hour after midnight. The convention met again on October 3, and nominated Mitchell May for secretary of state; re-nominated the other incumbent state officers Sohmer, Carmody, Kennedy and Bensel; and nominated William H. Cuddeback and John W. Hogan for the Court of Appeals.

The Independence League state convention met on October 3 at Arlington Hall in New York City. James A. Allen was Temporary and Permanent Chairman. They nominated Progressive Oscar S. Straus for Governor with 89 votes against 79 for Democrat William Sulzer, and then adjourned The convention met again on October 4, and nominated a ticket made up by Democrats Glynn, Sohmer and Cuddeback; Progressives Call, Palmieri, Leland and Kirchwey; and the only Independence Leaguer John Davis for treasurer. William Randolph Hearst himself endorsed Sulzer and Glynn.

Result
The whole Democratic ticket was elected in a three-cornered race.

The incumbents Sohmer, Carmody, Kennedy and Bensel were re-elected.

The Republican, Democratic, Independence League, Socialist and Prohibition parties maintained automatic ballot status (necessary 10,000 votes), the Progressive Party attained it, and the Socialist Labor Party did not re-attain it.

Obs.: 
Numbers are total votes on Progressive and Independence League tickets for Straus, Call, Palmieri, Leland and Kirchwey; and total votes on Democratic and Independence League tickets for Glynn, Sohmer and Cuddeback.
Analyzing the totals, the average strength of the Independence League was about 12,000 votes.

See also
 New York gubernatorial elections

Notes

Sources
Result: WILSON'S STATE PLURALITY in NYT on December 20, 1912
Result in the New York Red Book (1913)
Result: The Tribune Almanac 1913

1912
1912 New York (state) elections